The  National Football League season resulted in a tie for the Eastern Division title between the Philadelphia Eagles and Pittsburgh Steelers; both finished the regular season at , requiring a one-game playoff. They had split their two-game series in the season, with the home teams prevailing; the Steelers won by eleven on  while the Eagles carded a  shutout on November 30 at 

This division playoff game was the Steelers' first (and only until 1972) postseason appearance, and was played on December 21 at Forbes Field  The winner traveled to Chicago to play in the NFL championship game the following week against the Cardinals  at Comiskey Park. Originally scheduled for  the playoff pushed the title game to 

Scoring touchdowns in each of the first three quarters, the Eagles posted another  shutout to win the East title and advanced to the championship game

Tournament bracket

Eastern Division championship

NFL Championship game

References

1947
Playoffs